Wrust is a death metal band from Gaborone, Botswana. The band was formed in 2000.

History 

The band was formed in 2000. Until 2002, the band had had several member changes, with lead guitarist and vocalist Stux Daemon being the only remaining founding member. In early 2002, Dem Lord Master became the new drummer.

They performed in 2003 at the Gaborone Beerfest, the University of Botswana Freshers Ball in 2002 and 2005, as well as the Rock Against AIDS.

In 2003, the band recorded their first demo called Mirth of Sorrow, but it was never published due to poor production. The band took part in a Durban Battle of the Bands and placed second.

They were the opening act for Sepultura in 2003 at Durban. They have also shared the stage with Carcass and Entombed.

Wrust released their debut LP on 14 April 2007, titled Soulless Machine. The album was recorded over four days in Midrand, Johannesburg, after a delay in release due to massive storm and flooding in the Durban area.

In 2013, they released their second album, titled Intellectual Metamorphosis. In the same year, they also performed in Milan, Italy.

Style 

Wrust They have been described as death metal, groove metal and thrash metal. Their most common cited bands of influence and inspiration include Sepultura, Cannibal Corpse, Morbid Angel, Death, Obituary, Carcass, Killswitch Engage, Pantera, Napalm Death, Entombed, Atheist, and Metallica, among others.

Members 

Current members

 Stux Daemon – vocals, lead guitar (2000–present)
 Dem Lord Master – drums (2002–present)
 Ben Phaks – rhythm guitar (2008–present)
 Oppy Gae – bass (2008–present)

Previous members

 SBond – bass
 BG – rhythm guitar
 Damon D.O. – bass

Discography 

 Soulless Machine (2007)
 Intellectual Metamorphosis (2013)
Music videos
 Hate 'em all
 Why me
 Kill or be killed

References

External links 

 Wrust on Facebook
 Wrust on Bandcamp

Botswana death metal musical groups
Thrash metal musical groups
Groove metal musical groups
Musical quartets
Musical groups established in 2000